Tallar Sar-e Sharqi (also Romanized as Ţallār Sar-e Sharqī; also known as Tallār Sar-e Bālā) is a village in Chehel Shahid Rural District, in the Central District of Ramsar County, Mazandaran Province, Iran. At the 2006 census, its population was 68, in 22 families.

References 

Populated places in Ramsar County